The 2011–12 Biathlon World Cup – World Cup 6 was held in Antholz, Italy, from 19 January until 22 January 2012.

Schedule of events

Medal winners

Men

Women

Achievements

 Best performance for all time

 , 1st place in Sprint
 , 2nd place in Sprint
 , 29th place in Sprint
 , 51st place in Sprint
 , 13th place in Mass Start
 , 17th place in Sprint
 , 44th place in Sprint

References 

- World Cup 6, 2011-12 Biathlon World Cup
Biathlon World Cup - World Cup 6, 2011-12
January 2012 sports events in Europe
Biathlon competitions in Italy